Litle Sokumvatnet is a lake that lies in Gildeskål Municipality (with a very small portion crossing into neighboring Beiarn Municipality) in Nordland county, Norway.  Litle Sokumvatnet lies directly northeast of the larger lake Sokumvatnet. The lake serves as a reservoir for the Forså Hydroelectric Power Station.

See also
 List of lakes in Norway
 Geography of Norway

References

Gildeskål
Beiarn
Lakes of Nordland